Mario Fernández or Fernandez may refer to:

Mario Fernandez (boxer) (born 1993), Filipino boxer
Mario Fernández Baeza (born 1947), Chilean politician
Mario Fernández Ruyales (born 1984), Spanish footballer
Mario Fernández (field hockey) (born 1992), Spanish field hockey player
Mario Fernández (footballer, born 1922)
Mario Fernández (footballer, born 1988)